Udhaas is a 1993 Maldivian comedy drama film directed by Ahmed Nimal. Produced by Mohamed Rasheed under Ocean Films, the film stars Rasheed, Fathimath Rameeza and Waleedha Waleed in pivotal roles.

Premise
Shahir (Mohamed Rasheed) a wealthy businessman falls in love with a gorgeous woman, Shehenaz (Fathimath Rameeza). Through a phone conversation, Shahir arranges a date with Shehenaz, however a widow staying in her house, Shareefa (Sithi Fulhu), shows up to the meeting instead of Shehenaz, much to his discomfort. Shehenaz makes a surprise visit to him near his shop and they bond as they continue their conversation about their lives. A romantic relationship begins and together they start planning their future.

After their marriage, Shahir's father (Abdul Raheem) shows up at their doorstep announcing his disapproval for their relationship. However, their trust and love for each other was strong enough to hold them together. Soon after, she is blessed with the news of pregnancy. Their happiness was short lived as Shehenaz discovers that Shahir is already married to an infertile wealthy woman, Nazima (Waleedha Waleed) and together with his family, he is involved in a scam to "use her body" to fulfill the medical limitation of his first wife. Having the fear of them being exposed, Shahir's father ordered him to bring her back to their house at any cost. Betrayed, Shehenaz moves to her born island while Nazima returns to make the life of Shahir miserable.

Cast 
 Mohamed Rasheed as Shahir
 Fathimath Rameeza as Shehenaz
 Waleedha Waleed as Nazima
 Abdul Raheem as Shahir's father
 Aminath Ahmed Didi as Sameera; Shahir's mother
 Sithi Fulhu as Shareefa
 Ahmed Nimal as Kaleem
 Waheedha
 Suhail
 Haaroon
 Arif
 Fahumee
 Ahmed Sharumeel as Bento
 Hassan Zareer
 Hamdhan Rasheed
 Ali Shareef
 Mohamed Shareef
 Ali Rasheed
 Adam Saleem
 Aishath

Soundtrack

Release and reception
Upon release, the film received positive reviews from critics where the effort of its director was applauded for "carefully layering the romance and emotions with a pinch of humor", all thanks to the fabulous performance of Sithi Fulhu. Actor Rasheed picked the film as his personal "best performance" from his career. Soon after the release of the film, Rasheed took a break from acting citing the need to take treatment for psoriasis.

References

Maldivian comedy-drama films
1993 films
Films directed by Ahmed Nimal
1993 comedy-drama films
Dhivehi-language films